Gianluca Sansone (born 12 May 1987) is an Italian footballer who plays as a forward for Serie D club Casertana.

Career
Born in Potenza, Basilicata, Sansone started his career with Eccellenza Abruzzo side Montorio, located in Montorio al Vomano. In the next season, he was signed by newly promoted Serie D side Valle del Giovenco and won Serie D Group F champion. Sansone played with VdG in promotion playoffs but eliminated in semi-final/first round.

On 30 June 2008, he transferred to Serie A side Siena, where he signed a 5-year contract. He failed to become a member of first team and left for Lega Pro Prima Divisione club Gallipoli in January.

In July 2009, he remained in Prima Divisione but for Lanciano.

In June 2010, he was sold to fellow Serie B side Frosinone in co-ownership deal, for €400,000, as part of the deal that Siena, the newly relegated team signed Gennaro Troianiello outright, for €2 million. Frosinone also signed the remain 50% registration rights of Caetano Prósperi Calil.

Sassuolo
In June 2011 Siena bought back Sansone for €800,000, and re-sold to Sassuolo for €425,000 in another co-ownership deal. In June 2012 Sassuolo signed Sansone (€425,000) and Troianiello (€575,000) outright for a total of €1 million.

Torino 
In July 2012 Sansone was signed by Torino F.C. in another co-ownership deal for €1.6 million.

Sampdoria
In January 2013 Sansone was signed by U.C. Sampdoria from Torino for €1.45 million in a -year contract; Sassuolo retained its own 50% registration rights of Sansone. In June 2013 Sampdoria acquired Sansone outright from Sassuolo for another €1.25 million. Sassuolo also acquired 50% registration of Simone Zaza from Sampdoria for €2.5 million, which another half of Zaza was acquired by Juventus F.C. from Sampdoria.

Bologna (loan)
In January 2015 Sampdoria sold forwards Sansone and Manolo Gabbiadini to Bologna and Napoli respectively. Sansone only managed to play 4 games in 2014–15 Serie A.

At Bologna Sansone took no.11 from departing Friberg.

Bari (loan)
On 15 July 2015 he was signed by Bari.

Novara
On 13 July 2016 he was signed by Serie B club Novara. He spent  seasons with the Piedmontese club. However, he only played twice in 2018–19 Serie C.

On 31 January 2019, he terminated the contract in a mutual consent.

Neftchi
On 2 February 2019, he signed with the Azerbaijani club Neftchi Baku under the management of Italian coach Roberto Bordin. On 12 June, Neftchi released Sansone from his contract by mutual consent.

Serie D
On 11 October 2019 he joined Serie D club Audace Cerignola. On 25 September 2021, he moved to Casertana.

Honours 
Pescina Valle del Giovenco
 Serie D: 2006–07

Gallipoli
 Lega Pro Prima Divisione: 2008–09

References

External links
 Football.it Profile  
 
 
 La Gazzetta dello Sport Profile  

People from Potenza
1987 births
Living people
Italian footballers
Italian expatriate footballers
A.C.N. Siena 1904 players
A.S.D. Gallipoli Football 1909 players
S.S. Virtus Lanciano 1924 players
Frosinone Calcio players
U.S. Sassuolo Calcio players
Torino F.C. players
U.C. Sampdoria players
Bologna F.C. 1909 players
S.S.C. Bari players
Novara F.C. players
Neftçi PFK players
S.S.D. Audace Cerignola players
Casertana F.C. players
Serie A players
Serie B players
Serie C players
Serie D players
Azerbaijan Premier League players
Association football forwards
Sportspeople from the Province of Potenza
Italian expatriate sportspeople in Azerbaijan
Expatriate footballers in Azerbaijan
Footballers from Basilicata